Turning April is a 1996 Australian-Canadian film.

Premise
The wife of a diplomat is kidnapped.

Cast
Tushka Bergen
Aaron Blabey
Dee Smart
Justine Clarke
Judi Farr

Reception
Variety said "Several themes juggle for attention in" the film "which is part kidnap drama, part romance and part revenge movie, but dramatic structure remains unresolved. Despite a good perf from Tushka Bergen as a young wife kidnapped by an unlikely gang of thieves, long-delayed pic isn’t likely to elicit much box office interest."

References

External links
Turning April at IMDb
Turning April at Oz Movies
Turning April at TCMDB

1996 films
Australian drama films
Canadian drama films
English-language Canadian films
1990s Canadian films
1990s Australian films